Valentyn Mykhailovych Khodukin (17 August 1939 – 16 December 2020) was a Soviet footballer and Ukrainian football manager.

He died on 16 December 2020 in Lviv.

References

External links
 

1939 births
2020 deaths
Footballers from Kharkiv
Soviet footballers
Ukrainian footballers
Ukrainian football managers
Association football midfielders
FC Naftovyk Drohobych players
FC Karpaty Lviv players
FC Avanhard Ternopil players
FC Sokil Lviv players
Ukrainian Premier League managers
FC Skala Stryi (1911) managers
FC Mykolaiv managers
FC Hoverla Uzhhorod managers
FC Dynamo Lviv managers
FC Karpaty Lviv managers
FC Sokil Zolochiv managers
FC Kryvbas Kryvyi Rih managers
Shamakhi FK managers
Ukrainian expatriate football managers
Expatriate football managers in Azerbaijan
Ukrainian expatriate sportspeople in Azerbaijan